Frederick Barend Christoffel Kirsten (born ) is a former South African rugby union professional footballer that played as a prop.

In 2013, he was called up to the  squad following an injury to Frans Malherbe, but failed to make any appearances for the Springboks.

He announced his retirement in December 2014, aged 26, after suffering a neck injury in February of that year.

References

External links

Bulls profile
itsrugby.co.uk profile

1988 births
Living people
People from Sandton
Bulls (rugby union) players
Blue Bulls players
South African rugby union players
Rugby union props
Afrikaner people
South Africa Under-20 international rugby union players
Rugby union players from Gauteng